Hardinsburg is a home rule-class city in Breckinridge County, Kentucky, in the United States. It is the seat of its county. The population was 2,343 at the 2010 census. Hardinsburg was named after Captain William Hardin.

History

In August 1779, Sinclair Hardin, William's cousin, was the first man killed (by the Shawnee) west of the Alleghenies Mountains at Big Springs during an early excursion into the Kentucky wilderness.

Capt. William Hardin, brother of the Col. John Hardin for whom Hardin County was named, established a frontier fort at the site in 1780. The settlement was known variously as Hardin's Fort and Hardin's Station in the 18th century.

William Hardin received 400 acres as assignee of Benjamin Hardin, Warrant# 2586, dated February 14, 1780, and the tract was surveyed June 8, 1784. According to the description, the land was on Hardin's Creek, a branch of the Ohio River, and it was formally granted on June 21, 1786. This area would become Hardinsburg.

Hardinsburg was laid out in 1782 by William Hardin. It is small and its growth has been slow, having failed to number a thousand inhabitants in its first hundred years. Among its early and prominent citizens were Joseph Allen, Captain Thomas Kincheloe, Reverend James Taylor, Philip Lightfoot, Morris Hensly, Charles Hambleton, William Feaman, B and RM Wathen, John McClarty, William Morton, Stanley Singleton, James and Williamson Cox, William Seaton, Francis Peyton, Joseph Thomas, Thornton Smith, Jefferson Jennings and Dr. S.B. Abel. When Judge Kincheloe, Colonel Alf. Allen, Mr. Vivian Daniel, Rev. RG Gardner and Squire Eskridge die, the "old guard" will have become extinct.

William Hardin received grants from the state of Virginia in 1785 for 3800 acres of land, all near the present site of Hardinsburg, Kentucky.

The murder and scalping of young James Jolly was the second colonizer to be murdered by native Kentuckians at Hardin's Fort. James was the son of Nelson Jolly, Jr., the progenitor of the Jolly family of present-day Breckinridge County. At seventeen years of age, and newly arrived at the fort, James went alone to bring in the horses which were grazing along Clover Creek, a few hundred yards from its palisaded walls. When he did not return, a scouting party eventually found his mutilated body. James Jolly was the first person to die at Hardin's Station and the first to be buried under a hickory tree near the banks of Clover Creek, where, both his father and William Hardin were buried when they died.

Hardinsburg was established in 1800 as the seat of government for the newly established Breckinridge County. The first courthouse was a log house built in 1801. Jack Hardin's family book states family members laid out the town without compass or chain in the Fall of 1781; their only instruments were a vine and ax. Its post office was established on January 1, 1803, as Breckinridge Court House or Hardinburg.

The city was formally incorporated by the state assembly on May 3, 1890.

Geography
Hardinsburg is located at  (37.776336, −86.455010).

Demographics

As of the census of 2010, there were 2,343 people, 964 households, and 583 families residing in the city. The racial makeup of the city was 90.06% White, 8.61% African American, 0.17% Native American, 0.09% Asian, 0.13% from other races, and 0.94% from two or more races. Hispanics or Latinos of any race were 1.41% of the population.

There were 964 households, out of which 25.1% had children under the age of 18 living with them, 43.8% were married couples living together, 13.4% had a female householder with no husband present, and 39.5% were non-families. 36.8% of all households were made up of individuals, and 19.1% had someone living alone who was 65 years of age or older. The average household size was 2.19 and the average family size was 2.83.

The age distribution was 20.3% under the age of 18, 10.3% from 18 to 24, 25.4% from 25 to 44, 23.6% from 45 to 64, and 20.4% who were 65 years of age or older. The median age was 40 years. For every 100 females, there were 86.6 males. For every 100 females age 18 and over, there were 85.0 males.

The median income for a household in the city was $26,447, and the median income for a family was $36,214. Males had a median income of $29,375 versus $20,331 for females. The per capita income for the city was $18,307. About 14.6% of families and 19.3% of the population were below the poverty line, including 21.5% of those under age 18 and 18.9% of those age 65 or over.

Education
Hardinsburg has a public library, a branch of the Breckinridge County Public Library.

Notable people
 Butch Beard, former NBA All-Star
 Percy Beard, silver medalist hurdler in National Track and Field Hall of Fame
 Ralph Beard, member of "Fabulous Five" University of Kentucky men's basketball team
 Jenks "Tex" Carman, guitarist
 Donnie Gedling, former member of the Kentucky House of Representatives
 Bobbi Jordan, actress raised in Hardinsburg
 Lisa Thornhill, actress born and raised in Hardinsburg.

References

External links
 City of Hardinsburg official website

Cities in Breckinridge County, Kentucky
Cities in Kentucky
County seats in Kentucky